The Boston Red Sox are a professional baseball team.

Red Sox may also refer to:

Baseball

Active baseball teams
Boston Red Sox affiliates
Dominican Summer League Red Sox, rookie-level
Florida Complex League Red Sox, rookie-level
Salem Red Sox, Class A-Advanced
Worcester Red Sox, Triple-A

Other
Brantford Red Sox, a team in Ontario playing in the Intercounty Baseball League
Regina Red Sox, a team in Saskatchewan playing in the Western Canadian Baseball League
Yarmouth–Dennis Red Sox, a collegiate summer baseball team playing in the Cape Cod Baseball League

Defunct baseball teams

Allentown Red Sox
Bristol Red Sox
Fort Lauderdale Red Sox
Greenville Red Sox
Jamestown Red Sox
Lynn Red Sox
Marion Red Sox
Memphis Red Sox
Oneonta Red Sox
Pawtucket Red Sox
Pittsfield Red Sox
Reading Red Sox
San Jose Red Sox
Scranton Red Sox
Williamsport Red Sox
Winter Haven Red Sox

Renamed baseball teams
Bradenton Marauders, known as the Sarasota Red Sox from 1994 to 2004.
Lynchburg Hillcats, known as the Lynchburg Red Sox from 1988 to 1994.
New Britain Rock Cats, known as the  Bristol Red Sox from 1973 to 1982.
Winston-Salem Dash, known as the Winston-Salem Red Sox from 1961 to 1983.

Other uses
Red Sox Manawatu, a soccer and netball club based in Palmerston North, Manawatu, New Zealand
Red Sox (soccer) (later Riverside Red Sox), a former Palmerston North team which merged with others to become Red Sox Manawatu
Red Sox Nation, fans of the Boston Red Sox

See also
Boston Red Stockings (disambiguation)
Red socks (disambiguation)